The Herbst appliance is an orthodontic appliance used by orthodontists to correct class 2 retrognathic mandible in a growing patient. This is also called bitejumping. Herbst appliance parts include stainless steel surgical frameworks that are secured onto the teeth by bands or acrylic bites. These are connected by sets of telescoping mechanisms that apply gentle upward and backward force on the upper jaw, and forward force on the lower jaw. The original bite-jumping appliance (Herbst appliance) was designed by Dr. Emil Herbst and reintroduced by Dr. Hans Pancherz using maxillary and mandibular first molars and first bicuspids. The bands were connected with heavy wire soldered to each band and carried a tube and piston assembly that allowed mandibular movement but permanently postured the mandible forward. The appliance not only corrected a dental Class II to a dental Class I but also offered a marked improvement of the classic Class II facial profile.

History
It was developed by Emil Herbst in the early 1900s and was reintroduced in 1979 by Hans Pancherz, it is largely established in today's orthodontics for Class II therapy. Many designs of this appliance have since been developed such as Sabbagh Spring, Powerscope and Cantilever Bite Jumper (CBJ)

Modifications
There are 4 major modifications in the design of Herbst appliances known as Herbst 1, Herbst 2, Herbst 3 and Herbst 4. There are several variants of the Herbst appliance, including cast Herbst appliance and acrylic splint Herbst appliance.

Indications
The Herbst appliance is indicated for the noncompliance treatment of Class II skeletal malocclusions with retrognathic mandible  b) and in high angle patients due to the increase in sagittal condylar growth, c)in patients with deep anterior overbite d)in cases of mandibular midline deviation e) n mouth breathers due to the lack of interference while breathing.

The removable Acrylic Herbst Appliance can also be used in patients suffering from obstructive sleep apnea, in order to improve the clinical symptoms.
Herbst treatment is also good in postadolescent patients who have passed their peak pubertal growth, as the appliance can take advantage of the residual growth.

Treatment timing

The appropriate skeletal maturation period to initiate Herbst treatment is considered as a critical parameter for successful results. Herbst treatment before the pubertal peak of growth have lead to a normal skeletal and soft tissue morphology at a young age. However, this early approach needs retention of the treatment results until the eruption of all the permanent teeth into a stablerelationships. By starting treatment in the permanent dentition at or just after the pubertal growth peak, the larger increase in the condylar growth and the shorter retention phase required have lead to a more stable occlusion and reduced posttreatment relapse. However,some researchers have found that Herbst treatment was giving equal results in prepubertal and postpubertal patients although greater anchorage loss is to be anticipated in postpubertal patients.

References

Orthodontic appliances